A. J. M. "Ton" van Kesteren (born 26 August 1954) is a Dutch politician and real estate appraiser. Representing the Party for Freedom, he has been a member of the States of Groningen since 10 March 2011 and a member of the Senate of the Netherlands since 28 March 2017. He has worked as a teacher from 1978 until 2006 and he has been working as a real estate appraiser since 1996.

Electoral history

References 

1954 births
21st-century Dutch politicians
Living people
Members of the Provincial Council of Groningen
Members of the Senate (Netherlands)
Party for Freedom politicians
Politicians from Groningen (city)